Ning Li (January 14, 1943 – July 27, 2021) was an American scientist known for her controversial anti-gravity research. In the 1990s, Li worked as a research scientist at the Center for Space Plasma and Aeronomic Research, University of Alabama in Huntsville. In 1999, she left the university to form a company, AC Gravity, LLC, to continue anti-gravity research.

Anti-gravity claims
In a series of papers co-authored with fellow university physicist Douglas Torr and published between 1991 and 1993, she claimed a practical way to produce anti-gravity effects. She claimed that an anti-gravity effect could be produced by rotating ions creating a gravitomagnetic field perpendicular to their spin axis. In her theory, if a large number of ions could be aligned, (in a Bose–Einstein condensate) the resulting effect would be a very strong gravitomagnetic field producing a strong repulsive force. The alignment may be possible by trapping superconductor ions in a lattice structure in a high-temperature superconducting disc. Li claimed that experimental results confirmed her theories. Her claim of having functional anti-gravity devices was cited by the popular press and in popular science magazines with some enthusiasm at the time. In 1997 Li published a paper stating that recent experiments reported anomalous weight changes of 0.05-2.1% for a test mass suspended above a rotating superconductor. Although the same paper describes another experiment that showed the gravitational effect of a non rotating superconductor was very small, if any effect existed at all.

Li is reported to have left the University of Alabama in 1999 to found the company AC Gravity LLC. AC Gravity was awarded a U.S. DOD grant for $448,970 in 2001 to continue anti-gravity research. The grant period ended in 2002 but no results from this research were ever made public. No evidence exists that the company performed any other work, although as of 2021, AC Gravity still remains listed as an extant business.

Death
On July 27, 2021, Ning Li died at the age of 79.

See also
 Eugene Podkletnov

References

External links
 Breaking the Law of Gravity A 1998 Wired magazine article reviewing her work, as well as others.
 Bose-Einstein and Anti-Gravity A narrative of Li's theory of operation and her future plans from the 1990s.

21st-century American physicists
University of Alabama faculty
Anti-gravity
American women physicists
American women academics
1943 births
2021 deaths
21st-century American women scientists